Greenwood Cemetery is a historic rural cemetery in New Orleans, Louisiana.  The cemetery was opened in 1852, and is located on City Park Avenue (formerly Metairie Road) in the Navarre neighborhood.  The cemetery has a number of impressive monuments and sculptures. It is one of a group of historic cemeteries in New Orleans.

Notable burials

Civil War and other military figures
 Tomb of hundreds of unknown Confederate soldiers.
 Confederate Generals Young Marshall Moody (1822–1866), who died of yellow fever, Thomas M. Scott (1828–1876)
 Confederate supporter and resister of Union occupation William Bruce Mumford (1819–1862), who was hanged on June 7 for tearing down a United States flag during Union Army occupation of New Orleans during the American Civil War
 Union Army Brigadier General and Brevet Major General William Plummer Benton (1828–1867), who was Collector of Internal Revenue in the City of New Orleans after the Civil War and died of yellow fever
 There are nine British Commonwealth service personnel, registered by the Commonwealth War Graves Commission, who are buried or specially commemorated here – four from World War I and five from World War II.

Civic figures
  Journalist and author of Louisiana topics Gwen Bristow (1903–1980)
 Jazz musician Sam Butera (1927–2009)
 MLB pitcher Al Jurisich (1921–1981)
 MLB pitcher Jack Kramer (1918–1995)
 Politician Effingham Lawrence (1820–1878) who served a single day (March 3, 1875) as a US Congressman 
 Jazz musician Nick LaRocca (1889–1961)
 MLB pitcher Joe Martina (1889–1962)
 US District Court Judge A. J. McNamara (1936–2014) also served in the Louisiana House of Representatives
 Actor Emile Meyer (1910–1987)
 Jazz musician Leon Roppolo (1902–1943)
 Governor Oramel H. Simpson (1870–1932)
 MLB player, coach, and manager George "Bo" Strickland (1926–2010)
 Novelist John Kennedy Toole (1937–1969), who wrote A Confederacy of Dunces, a Pulitzer Prize winner
 Soprano Thaïs St. Julien (1945–2019)
 Michael Culligan, Assistant District Attorney for New Orleans (22 years)

Gallery

References

External links

 
 

Cemeteries in Louisiana
Geography of New Orleans
Protected areas of New Orleans
1852 establishments in Louisiana
Rural cemeteries
Cemeteries established in the 1850s